Nabil Nosair (11 October 1938 – 2 April 2016) was an Egyptian footballer who played as a left winger for Zamalek, He also played for the Egyptian national team. He represented Egypt in 1960 Summer Olympics and the 1964 Summer Olympics.

Honours
Zamalek SC
Egyptian Premier League: (3)
 1959–60, 1963–64, 1964–65
Egypt Cup: (2)
 1959–60, 1961–62

References

External links
 

1938 births
2016 deaths
People from Monufia Governorate
Egyptian footballers
Egypt international footballers
Zamalek SC players
Footballers at the 1960 Summer Olympics
Footballers at the 1964 Summer Olympics
Olympic footballers of Egypt
Egyptian Premier League players
Association football forwards
20th-century Egyptian people